To date, eight ships of the French Navy have borne the name of Suffren, in honour of the 18th-century French admiral Pierre André de Suffren.

French ships named Suffren 
  (1791–1794), a  74-gun ship of the line renamed Redoutable in 1794, famous for her defence at the Battle of Trafalgar in 1805, during which she killed Admiral Horatio Nelson.
  (1801–1815), a Téméraire-class 74-gun ship of the line.
  (1824–1865), a 90-gun ship of the line.
  (1866–1897), an armoured frigate.
   (1899–1916), a battleship.
  (1968–2008), a guided missile frigate.

Notes and references

Notes

References

Bibliography 
 
 
 Les bâtiments ayant porté le nom de Suffren. NetMarine.net. Retrieved 2011-12-02.

French Navy ship names

fr:Suffren#Navires